Mount Tsotsorkov is the rocky, partly ice-covered mountain extending 7.6 km in north-south direction, 3 km wide and rising to 1615 m in the northwest foothills of Forbidden Plateau on Danco Coast in Graham Land, Antarctica.  It surmounts Bagshawe Glacier to the southwest, and Andvord Bay and its southernmost part Lester Cove to the north where the ridge ends in Forbes Point.

The mountain is named after the Bulgarian industrialist Lachezar Tsotsorkov for his sustained support for the Bulgarian Antarctic programme.

Location
British mapping in 1980.

Maps
British Antarctic Territory. Scale 1:200000 topographic map. DOS 610 Series, Sheet W 64 62. Directorate of Overseas Surveys, Tolworth, UK, 1980.
 Antarctic Digital Database (ADD). Scale 1:250000 topographic map of Antarctica. Scientific Committee on Antarctic Research (SCAR). Since 1993, regularly upgraded and updated.

Notes

References
 Bulgarian Antarctic Gazetteer. Antarctic Place-names Commission. (details in Bulgarian, basic data in English)
 Mount Tsotsorkov. SCAR Composite Gazetteer of Antarctica

External links
 Mount Tsotsorkov. Copernix satellite image

Mountains of Graham Land
Bulgaria and the Antarctic
Danco Coast